This article lists the Canadian number-one albums of 1973. The chart was compiled and published by RPM every Saturday.

Two acts held the top position simultaneously in both the albums and singles charts: Carly Simon on January 27 and The Rolling Stones on October 20–27.

(Entries with dates marked thus* are not presently on record at Library and Archives Canada and were inferred from the following week's listing.)

See also
 1973 in music
 RPM number-one hits of 1973

References

1973 in Canadian music
1973